The ABA League Most Valuable Player Award (MVP) is an annual ABA League award given since the inaugural season to the best performing player of the regular season. The League is the top-tier regional men's professional basketball league that originally featured clubs from the former Yugoslavia (Bosnia and Herzegovina, Croatia, Montenegro, North Macedonia, Serbia and Slovenia).

Dejan Milojević won the award a record three times. Luka Žorić won it twice. Kenyan Weaks, Chester Mason, and David Simon of the United States and Goga Bitadze of Georgia are the only MVP winners outside the region. Dario Šarić in 2013–14 and Nikola Kalinić in 2021–22 are the only two players whose teams won championship that year. The award was not given in the 2019–20 season following season cancellation due to the COVID-19 pandemic.

Winners

Multiple winners

See also
ABA League Finals MVP
ABA League Top Scorer
ABA League Top Prospect
ABA League Ideal Starting Five
Player of the Month

References

External links
 Adriatic ABA League official website
 Adriatic ABA League page at Eurobasket.com

Mvp
Basketball most valuable player awards